Isaiah Lee (born 21 September 1999) is a Trinidadian footballer who plays for the Monroe Mustangs at Monroe College.

Career statistics

International

References

External links
 Isaiah Lee at CaribbeanFootballDatabase

Living people
1999 births
Trinidad and Tobago footballers
Trinidad and Tobago international footballers
Association football forwards
People from Sangre Grande region
Trinidad and Tobago expatriate footballers
Trinidad and Tobago expatriate sportspeople in the United States
Expatriate soccer players in the United States
College men's soccer players in the United States
2021 CONCACAF Gold Cup players